David Steele Allan (30 April 1863 – 26 June 1930) was a Scottish footballer who played for Queen's Park and the Scotland national team.

He was born in Irvine, North Ayrshire and learned his football at Ayr Academy and, on moving to Glasgow to begin his career as a stockbroker, he joined Queen's Park in 1880. He won four Scottish Cup medals with the club in 1881, 1884, 1886 and 1890 and played in the club's FA Cup finals of 1884 and 1885. He also played occasionally for London-based club Corinthians.

References

External links

International stats at londonhearts.com

1863 births
1930 deaths
Scottish footballers
Scotland international footballers
Corinthian F.C. players
Queen's Park F.C. players
British stockbrokers
Association football inside forwards
Association football wingers
Footballers from Irvine, North Ayrshire
Place of death missing
FA Cup Final players
People educated at Ayr Academy